In Ohio, State Route 50 may refer to:
U.S. Route 50 in Ohio, the only Ohio highway numbered 50 since 1927
Ohio State Route 50 (1923-1927), now SR 48